Melina Mae Cortez Duterte (born March 25, 1994), better known by her stage name Jay Som, is an American, Los Angeles-based singer-songwriter, multi-instrumentalist, producer and mixing engineer. Her debut record Everybody Works was released on Double Denim Records (UK & Japan) & Polyvinyl Records (Rest of the world) in March 2017, which was preceded by Turn Into, a collection of songs that first gained her attention as a singer-songwriter. The follow-up to Everybody Works and Jay Som's second home studio album, Anak Ko, was released on August 23, 2019 via Polyvinyl, Lucky Number and Inertia.

Early life
Duterte was born in Walnut Creek, California and raised in Pleasanton, California and Brentwood, California. She is the daughter of Filipino immigrants, and cites her parents' immigrant background and cultural customs as major influences.

Duterte grew up playing the trumpet and guitar, and began writing and recording music at the age of 12. She originally intended to attend a conservatory program for jazz but instead decided to focus on songwriting. After enrolling in community college and studying music production and recording, she began recording in her bedroom studio and self-released music under the moniker Jay Som, which was created from an online baby name generator and means "Victory Moon".

Career 
In November 2015, Duterte released nine tracks on her Bandcamp page under the name Untitled. They began to receive attention online despite the fact that they were intended to be demos, and were eventually re-released twice as Turn Into, first under Topshelf Records and then Polyvinyl Records in 2016. Following Turn Into, Duterte opened for Peter Bjorn and John, Mitski and Japanese Breakfast.

Everybody Works, Duterte's first proper album as Jay Som, was released March 10, 2017 under Polyvinyl and Double Denim Records. It was preceded by the song "1 Billion Dogs" in February. Duterte has said that the album's sound was influenced by Tame Impala, Yo La Tengo, the Pixies and Carly Rae Jepsen's E•MO•TION. Everybody Works landed on Best of 2017 lists from Pitchfork, NPR, Stereogum, Rolling Stone, Entertainment Weekly, Billboard and others.

In January 2018, Duterte released "Pirouette" and "O.K., Meet Me Underwater," singles that were recorded during the same sessions as Everybody Works but did not end up on the final track list. In June 2018, Duterte toured with The National in Dublin, Ireland. They also recently toured with the Alternative Rock band Paramore, and was their opening act for the second half of Tour 5.

In September 2018, Duterte released a split EP Nothing's Changed with singer/songwriter Justus Proffit. The EP consists of 5 tracks, all recorded in her home recording studio - where she also recorded Everybody Works.

The follow-up to Everybody Works, Anak Ko, was released on August 23, 2019 via Polyvinyl.

On October 28, 2020, Duterte announced a new project Routine with Chastity Belt bassist Annie Truscott by releasing their first single "Cady Road". Routine's debut EP And Other Things is set for release on November 20 via Friends Of/Dead Oceans.

Musical style and reception 
Duterte performs all the music on her recordings, and records in a makeshift studio in her bedroom. She describes her style as "headphone music".

Joe Coscarelli of The New York Times described Jay Som's music as "D.I.Y. bedroom pop" and noted its intimate, lo-fi aesthetic. Liz Pelly of Time Out New York called her sound "mesmerizing and multidimensional dream pop that favors reality over escapism, drawing from classic pop and funk". Pelly also described Duterte's singing as "low and languid".

Pitchfork has compared Jay Som's intimate sound and vulnerability to the music of Phil Elverum and Carly Rae Jepsen, and Duterte has stated that Elverum's music has had a profound impact on her own. Karaoke singing and listening to Yo La Tengo and My Bloody Valentine also have influenced Duterte's vocal style.

Discography

Studio albums

Extended plays

Singles

As lead artist

As featured artist

Guest appearances

Music videos

References

External links 
 Jay Som at Bandcamp

1994 births
21st-century American women musicians
American musicians of Filipino descent
Dream pop musical groups
LGBT people from California
American LGBT singers
American LGBT people of Asian descent
Musicians from Oakland, California
Polyvinyl Record Co. artists
Living people
Feminist musicians
Asian American music